Juan Soler Valls Quiroga (born January 19, 1966) is an Argentine-Mexican actor and former model and rugby union footballer. He was married to Argentine actress Magdalena "Maki"  Moguilevsky with whom he has two daughters.

Biography

Personal life
Soler was born in San Miguel de Tucumán, Argentina to Juan Soler Valls and Keky Quiroga. He has three siblings: Facundo, Maria Jose, and Maria Ines.

As a teenager he played rugby union and became part of the Argentina national rugby union team Los Pumas. He later became a model and started acting in plays in Argentina.

On December 20, 2003, he married actress Magdalena "Maki" Moguilevsky He owns a restaurant called El Che Loco in Mexico City. He has three daughters: Valentina, from a previous relationship, she was born in 1991 and lives in Argentina; the second daughter, Mia, was born on December 18, 2004, and his third daughter, Azùl, was born on February 20, 2007. Mia has a condition called Situs Inversus. In March 2005, Maki lost a pregnancy of three months.

Career

In 1994, after participating in the TV show Montaña rusa (TV series)|Montaña rusa and the play Juegos de sociedad he decided to move to Mexico. There, he obtained small roles in two telenovelas with Televisa and in 1996 he starred in Cañaveral de pasiones which became the most successful production of that year. He then joined the cast of Verónica Castro's telenovela Pueblo chico, infierno grande, and the Mexican production of the play P.S. Your Cat Is Dead as Eddie, touring Mexico and the United States. He also appeared in the Peruvian telenovela María Emilia: Querida. He returned to Mexico in 2000 and has made five telenovelas as of 2005, including Locura de Amor and Bajo La Misma Piel, both of which co-starred Laisha Wilkins.  Juan Soler appeared in the telenovela Apuesta por un Amor with Patricia Manterola in 2004, and it garnered him a best actor nomination. In 2006, he appeared in the popular Televisa hit La fea más bella.

Filmography

Theater
 Me fascina mi vecina (2000)
 P.S. Your Cat Is Dead (1999)
 Bajo las sábanas (1997)
 Juego de sociedad (1993–1994)

References

External links
 

1966 births
Living people
People from San Miguel de Tucumán
Argentine male stage actors
Argentine male telenovela actors
Argentine emigrants to Mexico
Naturalized citizens of Mexico
Argentine rugby union players
Mexican male stage actors
Mexican male film actors
Argentine male models
Argentina international rugby union players